This is a list of compositions by Antonín Dvořák by genre. There is a separate sortable list.

Antonín Dvořák composed over 200 works, most of which have survived. They include nine symphonies, ten operas, four concertos and numerous vocal, chamber and keyboard works. His most famous pieces of music include the Ninth Symphony (From the New World), the Cello Concerto, the American String Quartet, the Slavonic Dances, and the opera Rusalka. 

This article constitutes a list of Dvořák's known works organized by their genre. They are in chronological order, referenced by Burghauser number.

Symphonies 
Symphony No. 1 in C minor (The Bells of Zlonice), B. 9 (1865)
Symphony No. 2 in B♭ major, B. 12 (1865)
Symphony No. 3 in E♭ major, B. 34 (1873)
Symphony No. 4 in D minor, B. 41 (1874)
Symphony No. 5 in F major, B. 54 (1875)
Symphony No. 6 in D major, B. 112 (1880)
Symphony No. 7 in D minor, B. 141 (1884-1885)
Symphony No. 8 in G major, B. 163 (1889)
Symphony No. 9 in E minor (From the New World), B. 178 (1893)

Orchestral works 
7 Interludes, B. 15 (1867)
Nocturne in B, B. 47 (1875)
Serenade for Strings in E major, B. 52 (1875)
Symphonic Variations, B. 70 (1877)
Slavonic Dances
Series I: B. 83 (1878)
Series II: B. 147 (1887)
3 Slavonic Rhapsodies, B. 86 (1878)
Festival March in C major, B. 88 (1879)
Prague Waltzes in D major, B. 99 (1879)
Polonaise in E major, B. 100 (1879)
Polka "For Prague Students" B. 114 (1880)
Gallop in E major, B. 119 (1881)
Legends, B. 122 (1881)
Scherzo capriccioso, B. 131 (1883)

Overtures 
Tragic Overture, B. 16a (1870)
My Home, B. 125a (1882)
Hussite Overture, B. 132 (1883)
In Nature's Realm, B. 168 (1891)
Carnival Overture, B. 169 (1891)
Othello Overture, B. 174 (1892)

Orchestral suites 
Czech Suite, B. 93 (1879)
Suite in A major (American), B. 190 (1895)

Symphonic poems 
 Symphonic Poem (Rhapsody) in A minor, B. 44 (1874)
The Water Goblin, B. 195 (1896)
The Noon Witch, B. 196 (1896)
The Golden Spinning Wheel, B. 197 (1896)
The Wild Dove, B. 198 (1896)
A Hero's Song, B. 199 (1897)

Concertante works

Cello and orchestra 
Cello Concerto in A major, B. 10 (1865)
Cello Concerto in B minor, B. 191 (1894-1895)
Rondo in G minor, B. 181 (1893)
Silent Woods, B. 182 (1893)

Piano and orchestra 
Piano Concerto in G minor, B. 63 (1876)

Violin and orchestra 
Romance in F minor for violin and orchestra, B. 39 (1873)
Mazurka in E minor, B. 90 (1879)
Violin Concerto in A minor, B. 96/108 (1879/1880)

Operas 
Alfred, B. 16 (1870)
King and Charcoal Burner, B. 21/42/151 (1871/1874/1887)
The Stubborn Lovers, B. 46 (1874)
Vanda, B. 55 (1875)
The Cunning Peasant, B. 67 (1877)
Dimitrij, B. 127 (1881-1882)
The Jacobin, B. 200 (1897)
The Devil and Kate, B. 201 (1898-1899)
Rusalka, B. 203 (1900)
Armida, B. 206 (1902-1903)

Vocal music

Choral music

Chorus and orchestra 
 Stabat Mater, B. 71 (1876-1877)
 The Heirs of the White Mountain, B. 102/134 (1880/1884)
 The Spectre's Bride, B. 135 (1884)
 Hymn of the Czech Peasants, B. 143 (1885)
 Saint Ludmilla, B. 144 (1885-1886)
 Mass in D major, B. 153/175 (1887/1892)
 Psalm 149, B. 154 (1887)
 Requiem, B. 165 (1890)
 Te Deum, B. 176 (1892)
 The American Flag, B. 177 (1892-1893)
 Festival Song, B. 202 (1900)
 Old Folks at Home, B. 605 (1894)

Mixed chorus 
The Heirs of the White Mountain, B. 27 (1872)
 4 Choruses, B. 59 (1876)
In Nature's Realm, B. 126 (1882)

Male chorus 
 3 Choral Songs, B. 66 (1877)
Bouquet of Czech Folksongs, B. 72 (1877)
Song of a Czech, B. 73 (1877)
 From a Bouquet of Slavonic Folksongs, B.76 (1877-1878)
 5 Choruses, B. 87 (1878)
 Psalm 149, B. 91 (1879)
 2 Irish Songs, B. 601 (1878)

Female chorus 
 Moravian Duets, B. 107 (1880)

Voice and piano 
Cypresses, B. 11 (1865)
2 Songs, B. 13 (1865)
Songs on Words by Eliška Krásnohorská, B. 23 (1871)
The Orphan, B. 24 (1871)
Rosmarine, B. 24bis (1871)
4 Songs on Serbian Folk Poems, B. 29 (1872)
 Songs from the "Dvůr Králové" Manuscript ("Queen's Court"), B. 30 (1872)
Evening Songs, B. 61a/b (1876)
Ave Maria, B. 68 (1877)
3 Modern Greek Songs, B. 84b (1878)
Gypsy Songs, B. 104 (1880)
2 Czech Folk Poems, B. 142 (1885)
In Folk Tone, B. 146 (1886)
4 Songs on Poems by O. Malybrok-Stieler, B. 157 (1887-1888)
Biblical Songs, B. 185 (1894)
Lullaby, B. 194 (1895)
Song of the Smith of Lešetín, B. 204 (1901)

Voice and organ 
Hymnus ad laudes in festo Sanctae Trinitatis, B. 82 (1878)
Ave maris stella, B. 95a (1879)
O sanctissima dulcis virgo Maria!, B. 95b (1879)

Other  
Moravian Duets, B. 50, 60, 62, 69
Children's Song for two voices unaccompanied, B. 113 (1880)

Chamber music

String quartets 
String Quartet No. 1 in A major, B. 8 (1862)
String Quartet No. 2 in B major, B. 17 (1869)
String Quartet No. 3 in D major, B. 18 (1869)
String Quartet No. 4 in E minor, B. 19 (1870)
String Quartet No. 5 in F minor, B. 37 (1873)
String Quartet No. 6 in A minor, B. 40 (1873)
String Quartet No. 7 in A minor, B. 45 (1874)
String Quartet No. 8 in E major, B. 57 (1876)
String Quartet No. 9 in D minor, B. 75 (1877)
String Quartet No. 10 in E major (Slavonic), B. 92 (1878-79)
String Quartet No. 11 in C major, B. 121 (1881)
String Quartet No. 12 in F major (American), B. 179 (1893)
String Quartet No. 13 in G major, B. 192 (1895)
String Quartet No. 14 in A major, B. 193 (1895)

String quartet movements 
String quartet movement in F major, B. 120 (1881)
Cypresses, B. 152 (1887)
Andante appassionato in F major, B. 40a (1873)
2 Waltzes in A and D major, B. 105 (1880)

String quintets 
String Quintet No. 1 in A minor, B. 7 (1861)
String Quintet No. 2 in G major, B. 49 (1875)
String Quintet No. 3 in E major (American), B. 180 (1893)

Piano trios 
Piano Trio No. 1 in B major, B. 51 (1875)
Piano Trio No. 2 in G minor, B. 56 (1876)
Piano Trio No. 3 in F minor, B. 130 (1883)
Piano Trio No. 4 in E minor (Dumky), B. 166 (1890-1891)

Piano quartets 
Piano Quartet No. 1 in D major, B. 53 (1875)
Piano Quartet No. 2 in E minor, B. 162 (1889)

Piano quintets 
Piano Quintet No. 1 in A major, B. 28 (1872)
Piano Quintet No. 2 in A major, B. 155 (1887)

Violin and piano 
Romance in F minor, B. 38 (1873)
Nocturne in B major, B. 48a (1883)
Capriccio in C major, B. 81 (1878)
Mazurka in E minor, B. 89 (1879)
Sonata in F major, B. 106 (1880)
Ballade in D minor, B. 139 (1884)
Romantic Pieces, B. 150 (1887)
Sonatina in G major, B. 183 (1893)
Slavonic Dance No. 2 in E minor, B. 170 (1891)

Cello and piano 
 Polonaise in A major, B. 94 (1879)
Rondo in G minor, B. 171 (1891)
Silent Woods, B. 173 (1891)
Slavonic Dance Nos. 3 and 8, B. 172 (1891)

Other 
Serenade for flute, violin, viola and triangle, B. 15bis (1867)
Serenade in D minor for Wind Instruments, B. 77 (1878)
Bagatelles for two violins, cello and harmonium or piano, B. 79 (1878)
String Sextet in A major, B. 80 (1878)
Terzetto in C for two violins and viola, B. 148 (1887)
Drobnosti for two violins and viola, B. 149 (1887)
Gavotte in G minor for three violins, B. 164 (1890)
Fanfares in C major for 4 trumpets and timpani, B. 167 (1891)

Keyboard music

Solo piano 
Forget-me-not Polka in C major, B. 1 (1854)
Per Pedes Polka, B. 2bis (1859)
Polka in E major, B. 3 (1860)
 Potpourri on King and Charcoal Burner , B. 22/43 (1871-1875)
Silhouettes, B. 32/98 (1872/1879)
2 Minuets, B. 58 (1876)
Dumka in D minor, B. 64 (1876)
Theme and Variations in A major, B. 65 (1876)
Scottish Dances, B. 74 (1877)
2 Furiants, B. 85 (1878)
8 Waltzes, B. 101 (1879-1880)
4 Eclogues, B. 103 (1880)
4 Album Leaves, B. 109 (1880)
6 Piano Pieces, B. 110 (1880)
6 Mazurkas, B. 111 (1880)
Moderato in A major, B. 116 (1881)
Question in G minor, B. 128bis (1882)
Impromptu in D minor, B. 129 (1883)
Dumka in C minor, B. 136 (1884)
Furiant in G minor, B. 137 (1884)
Humoresque in F major, B. 138 (1884-1892)
2 Little Pearls, B. 156 (1887)
Album Leaf in E major, B. 158 (1888)
13 Poetic Tone Poems, B. 161 (1889)
Suite in A major (American), B. 184 (1894)
Humoresques, B. 187 (1894)
2 Piano Pieces in G major and G minor, B. 188 (1894)

Piano four hands 
 Nocturne, B. 48b (1882)
Slavonic Dances
Series I: B. 78 (1878)
Series II: B. 145 (1886)
Legends, B. 117 (1881)
From the Bohemian Forest, B. 133 (1883-1884)

Organ 
 8 Preludes and Fugues, B. 302 (1859)

 
Dvorak
Dvorak
Dvorak